The 2013 Oddset Hockey Games was played between 6–10 February 2013. The Czech Republic, Finland, Sweden and Russia played a round-robin for a total of three games per team and six games in total. Five of the matches were played in the Malmö Arena in Malmö, Sweden, and one match in the Ice Palace in Saint Petersburg, Russia. Finland won the tournament for the fourth time. The tournament was part of the 2012–13 Euro Hockey Tour.

Standings

Games
All times are local (UTC+1 for the games in Sweden, and UTC+4 for the game in Russia).

Scoring leaders
GP = Games played; G = Goals; A = Assists; Pts = Points; +/− = Plus/minus; PIM = Penalties in minutes; POS = PositionSource:

Goaltending leaders
TOI = Time On Ice (minutes:seconds); SA = Shots against; GA = Goals against; GAA = Goals against average; Sv% = Save percentage; SO = ShutoutsSource:

Tournament awards
Best players selected by the directorate:
Best Goaltender:       Alexander Salak
Best Defenceman:       Ilya Nikulin
Best Forward:          Juhamatti Aaltonen
Top Scorer:            Sergei Mozyakin (1 goal, 3 assists)
Most Valuable Player:  Juhamatti Aaltonen

Tournament All-Star Team selected by the media: 
Goaltender:  Alexander Salak 
Defencemen:  Ilya Nikulin,  Ville Lajunen
Forwards:  Juhamatti Aaltonen,  Sergei Mozyakin,  Evgeny Kuznetsov

References

External links
Hockeyarchives 

2012–13 Euro Hockey Tour
2012–13 in Swedish ice hockey
2012–13 in Russian ice hockey
2012–13 in Finnish ice hockey
2012–13 in Czech ice hockey
Sweden Hockey Games
February 2013 sports events in Europe
2010s in Malmö
International sports competitions in Malmö
Events at Malmö Arena